María Eugenia Rojas Correa (born 6 October 1932) is a retired Colombian political figure. The daughter of the 19th President of Colombia, Gustavo Rojas Pinilla. 

During her father's government she fought for women's rights by getting the recognition of all their rights and helped create female police.

She served as Member of the Chamber of Representatives of Colombia from 1962 to 1964, and as Member of the Senate of Colombia from 1966 to 1974. 

In 1974 she became the first woman to run for president in all of Latin America, managing to get third place in representation of the National Popular Alliance, the party that she and her father helped create. 

She is married to Samuel Moreno Díaz and has two sons, Samuel Moreno Rojas and Néstor Iván Moreno Rojas, who have both been involved in politics and have been involved in corruption scandals.

References

1932 births
Living people
People from Santander Department
Maria Eugenia
Children of presidents of Colombia
Colombian aviators
Colombian suffragists
20th-century Colombian women politicians
20th-century Colombian politicians
Trinity Washington University alumni
Women aviators
Members of the Chamber of Representatives of Colombia
Members of the Senate of Colombia
National Popular Alliance politicians
Colombian feminists